Robert Wiedemer (born 1959), is the co-author, along with John David Wiedemer and Cindy Spitzer, of several books including America's Bubble Economy, Aftershock and Aftershock Investor. In America's Bubble Economy, published in 2006, Wiedemer and his co-authors claimed that the US economy was resting on a series of six bubbles which would pop in the following years. In Aftershock, the authors claimed that the economic downturn of 2008 was due to four of the six bubbles popping, and that the popping of the remaining two would send the world into a depression. The second edition of Aftershock made best-seller lists in The New York Times, The Wall Street Journal, and Amazon.com.

Wiedemer is Managing Director of Ark Financial. He holds an MBA from the University of Wisconsin–Madison with a speciality in Marketing, and is of German descent.

References 

Living people
1959 births
Wisconsin School of Business alumni
American male writers